Advanced Research Centre for Bamboo and Rattan (ARCBR) Aizawl was established in 2004 as an advanced research centre under the Indian Council of Forestry Research and Education, Dehradun.

See also
 Indian Council of Forestry Research and Education
 Van Vigyan Kendra (VVK) Forest Science Centres

References

Bamboo
Calamoideae
Organisations based in Mizoram
Indian forest research institutes
Forestry education in India
Forestry Research and Education
Indian Council of Forestry Research and Education
Ministry of Environment, Forest and Climate Change
Research institutes in Mizoram
2004 establishments in Mizoram
Research institutes established in 2004